The Fast and the Furious is a racing video game based on the film of the same name developed and
published by Raw Thrills for arcades in July 2004 The game's lead designer was Eugene Jarvis, who had previously been the lead designer of the Cruis'n series, with which it shares gameplay elements. It was released in Japan by Taito as Wild Speed. 

The arcade version was adapted for the Wii under the name Cruis'n with all the elements of the Fast & Furious license removed.

Gameplay 
 The Fast and the Furious  plays very similarly to the  Cruis'n  series of games also designed by Eugene Jarvis. There are 12 tracks in total and 16 cars to choose from. The game tracks are based on real life locations.

After entering enough credits to play, players can enter a PIN number using the built-in numeric keypad. This PIN number stores player data, including money earned from another game session.

Each race is simple, without shortcuts or alternative paths. Players can step on the gas, release it, and then quickly press it again for a little boost, and the car will blow the front wheels up in the air. When the front wheels are in the air and the player hits another car or jumps, the car will jump higher in the air and do cartwheels.

Sequels 
In 2007, Raw Thrills released The Fast and the Furious: Drift, partly based on the third film. In 2010, A third game in the series, Fast & Furious: SuperCars was released. Both sequels were available as new units or as upgrades to existing F&F arcade units. After Raw Thrills' Fast & Furious license expired, a revision of the game removed the branding, renaming the game to simply SuperCars.

Raw Thrills regained the F&F license in 2022, and a fourth game Fast & Furious Arcade was released on October 7th of the same year.

References

External links
Raw Thrills, Inc. page

2004 video games
Arcade video games
Arcade-only video games
Street racing video games
Fast & Furious video games
Video games based on films
Video games developed in the United States
Video games set in the United States
Multiplayer and single-player video games
Raw Thrills games
Taito arcade games